Dayachand Mayna was a poet of Haryanvi language. He is one of the important poets and folklore artists Haryana had ever produced. He was born on 10 March 1915, in a Valmiki caste family in Mayna village of Rohtak district of Haryana (erstwhile Punjab).He produced best of the Haryanvi Saang and Raagni.He wrote a very famous play (Kissa) on Netaji Subhash Chandra Bose. He wrote 21 Kissas(play in Haryanvi) and more than 150 Raagniyaan(poem in Haryanvi).  He died on 20 January 1993.

Legacy 
He is regarded as the John Milton of Haryana,
 his poetry in Haryanvi is not less than Lakhmi Chand. Dr. Rajendra Badgujar in his book argued that "if you want to know Haryanvi folklore then you have to read Mahashaya Dayachand Mayna. Apart from poetry, he is considered a freedom fighter for his service in the Indian National Army. Dayachand Mayna had many disciples including most famous Chajjulal Silana.

Publications 
Badgujar, Rajinder (Ed.) (2011). Mahashaya Dayachand Mayna Haryanvi Granthawali. Kaithal, Haryana: Sukriti Prakashan. 
 Badgujar, Rajinder (Ed.) (2012). Dayachand Mayna Ki Chuninda Raagniyaan. Kaithal, Haryana: Sukriti Prakashan.

Further reading 
 Badgujar, Rajinder (Ed.) (2011). Mahashaya Dayachand Mayna Haryanvi Granthawali. Kaithal,Haryana: Sukriti Prakashan. 
Badgjar, Rajinder (Ed.) (2012). Mahashaya Dayachand Mayna Ki Chuninda Raagniyaan. Kaithal,Haryana: Sukriti Prakashan. 

Kashyap Deepak (2022). Can Vailmiki Become a Poet? Contemporary Voices of Dalit.

See also 
 Baje Bhagat
 Lakhmi Chand
 Music of Haryana
 Haryanvi cinema
 List of Haryanvi-language films

References

External links 

 Dayachand Mayna at Kavita Kosh
 Article on Chajjulal Silana Published in Forward Press

20th-century Indian poets
Poets from Haryana
Indian male poets
Folk artists
1915 births
1993 deaths
20th-century Indian male writers